Ma. Merceditas Consunji Navarro Gutierrez (born September 24, 1948) is a Filipino former government official who served as the 4th ombudsman of the Philippines. After graduating from the Ateneo de Manila University Law School in 1973, she quickly established herself as a valuable government figure. Aside from becoming a two-time Justice Secretary of the Philippine Justice Department, Gutierrez also became the first woman to head the post of Ombudsman. She assumed the position on December 1, 2005, and resigned from office on April 29, 2011.

Early life
Merceditas Gutierrez was the second child of the former Vice-Governor and Representative of Bataan, Rufino Navarro Sr. and Candelaria Consunji. She was the second of five children and attended elementary and high school in the small town of Samal, Bataan. Gutierrez moved to Manila for College and graduated from the Ateneo de Manila University Law School in 1973, wherein she was a schoolmate of the future First Gentleman Mike Arroyo. She was initially unable to take the Bar exam due to her pregnancy with her first child, Johnny Gutierrez. However, upon taking the Bar the next year, Merceditas successfully passed her first attempt. Soon after, in 1983, she began engaging herself in government services. She became the Legal Officer of the Philippine Aerospace Development Corporation (PADC), then, Presidential Legal Officer of the Philippine Presidential Office. Her achievements in those government offices earned her a personal promotion by then-President Gloria Macapagal Arroyo to the National Economic and Development Authority of the Philippines.

Justice Secretary
Atty. Merceditas Gutierrez worked for the Department of Justice for almost two decades and was appointed by President Gloria Macapagal-Arroyo as Undersecretary of Justice in 2001. In the year 2002, Gutierrez was designated as the Acting Secretary for Secretary Hernani Perez then, Secretary Simeon Datumanong in 2004.

Ombudsman

On December 1, 2005, President Arroyo appointed Gutierrez to the post of Ombudsman, who is responsible for investigating erring government officials. Thus, she became the first woman to be appointed as ombudsman in the Philippine Republic.

In June 2007, she was elected as Vice-President of the 22-member Asian Ombudsman Association (AOA), a regional grouping which aims to improve multilateral cooperation among Asian countries in the fight against the social menace.

In March 2009, former Senate President Jovito Salonga and civil society groups filed impeachment charges before the Philippine Congress against Gutierrez, alleging that she mishandled cases. The complaint was later dismissed.

On July 22, 2010, a new impeachment complaint was filed against Gutierrez by then party-list representative Risa Hontiveros-Baraquel, former Brigadier General Danilo Lim and Evelyn Pestano on the basis of "illegal, unjust, improper or inefficient" handling of cases. In August 2010, another impeachment complaint was filed by Bagong Alyansang Makabayan for inaction on the Fertilizer Fund scam, the Euro Generals scandal, and the Mega Pacific scandal. The Senate Blue Ribbon Committee on March 10, 2011, recommended the impeachment and resignation of Ombudsman Merceditas Gutierrez as well as the firing of members of the Office of the Special Prosecutor for "neglecting, weakening and complicating" the plunder case against former military comptroller Maj. Gen. Carlos Garcia and his family. On March 22, 2011, the House of Representatives voted to impeach Gutierrez on charges of betraying the public trust, with 4 representatives abstaining, 46 against, and 210 for the impeachment, thereby sending the impeachment to the Senate.

See also 
 Ombudsman of the Philippines
 Department of Justice (Philippines)

References

External links
Office of the Ombudsman - Official Website

|-

|-

Living people
Filipino women lawyers
Ombudsmen in the Philippines
Secretaries of Justice of the Philippines
Impeached Filipino officials
Arroyo administration cabinet members
Ateneo de Manila University alumni
1948 births
20th-century Filipino lawyers